Karifa Yao (born September 28, 2000) is a Canadian professional soccer player who plays as a defender for Vancouver Whitecaps FC in Major League Soccer.

Early life
Yao began playing youth soccer at age seven with CS Fabrose. Afterwards, he joined youth club Étoiles de l’Est. He was also part of the National High Performance Centre. In 2017, he joined the Montreal Impact Academy, playing a year with the U17s, before playing two years with the U19s.

Club career
In June 2019, Yao signed a homegrown contract with Montreal Impact. He made his professional debut on September 20, 2020, appearing as a substitute against the Philadelphia Union.

In February 2021, Yao went on a season-long loan to Canadian Premier League side Cavalry FC. On November 20, Yao scored his first professional goal against Pacific FC, netting the equalizer in their 2021 CPL season play-off semi-final, which ultimately ended in a 2-1 defeat for Cavalry. He was selected as Cavalry fans’ Player of the Year in 2021. After the 2021 season, Cavalry announced that Yao would leave the club at the end of his loan spell, and CF Montréal announced that they would exercise the option on Yao's contract for 2022. In March 2022, he extended his contract with Montreal adding another option year, while also returning to Cavalry on loan for a second season. He played a pivotal role for Cavalry, leading all outfield players in minutes played for the team. Over his time with Cavalry, he scored two goals and added two assists in 56 games, across all competitions.

After the 2022 season, his option was declined by Montreal and he departed the club. However, at the 2022 MLS Re-Entry Draft, Vancouver Whitecaps FC announced they had picked up Yao's contract for the 2023 season. He made his debut for the Whitecaps on March 8 , in a CONCACAF Champions League match against Honduran club Real España.

International career
In March 2015, he was called up to a camp with the Canada U15 team. In April 2017, he was called up to a camp with the Canada U17 team.

Personal life
Yao was born in to an Ivorian father and a Senegalese mother.

Career statistics

Notes

References

External links
 

2000 births
Living people
Canadian soccer players
Canadian people of Ivorian descent
Canadian people of Senegalese descent
Association football defenders
Soccer players from Montreal
CF Montréal players
Cavalry FC players
Major League Soccer players
Canadian Premier League players
Homegrown Players (MLS)
Vancouver Whitecaps FC players
FC Laval players